Banque Internationale pour la Centrafrique is a major bank of the Central African Republic.

The name of the bank is abbreviated to BICA.

External links
BICA's page at Annulaires Afrique 

Companies of the Central African Republic
Banks of the Central African Republic
Banks with year of establishment missing